Denniston may refer to:

People
 Alastair Denniston (1881–1961), British codebreaker 
 James Dennistoun (1805-1855), Scottish advocate and antiquarian
 John Dewar Denniston (1887–1949), British classical scholar
 Lyle Denniston, American legal journalist and professor
 Robert Denniston (1800–67), American lawyer and politician
 Robin Denniston (1926–2012), British publisher, son of Alastair
 Thomas Denniston (1821–97), New Zealand farmer and newspaper editor

Places
 Denniston, New Zealand
 Denniston, former name of Olivehurst, California
 Denniston, Kentucky, United States
 Denniston Creek, California, United States
 Denniston House, Cassville, Wisconsin, United States

See also
 Deniston (disambiguation)
 Dennistoun, a district in Glasgow, Scotland
 Dennistoun (ward), local government locality centred on the above district